Tonggu County is a county of Jiangxi province, People's Republic of China, bordering Hunan province to the west. It is under the jurisdiction of the prefecture-level city of Yichun.

Administrative divisions
In the present, Tonggu County has 6 towns and 3 townships. 
6 towns

3 townships
 Gaoqiao
 Gangkou
 Daixi

Demographics 

Climate

Notes and references

External links 
  Government site - 

 
County-level divisions of Jiangxi